Doropo is a town in the far northeast of Ivory Coast. It is a sub-prefecture of and the seat of Doropo Department in Bounkani Region, Zanzan District, adjacent to the border with Burkina Faso. Doropo is also a commune. Fifteen kilometres northwest of town is a border crossing with Burkina Faso.
In 2021, the population of the sub-prefecture of Doropo was 48,225.

Villages
The hundred and four villages of the sub-prefecture of Doropo and their population in 2014 are:

Notes

Sub-prefectures of Bounkani
Communes of Bounkani